John Quinn Trojanowski (December 17, 1946 – February 8, 2022) was an American academic research neuroscientist specializing in neurodegeneration. He and his partner, Virginia Man-Yee Lee, MBA, Ph.D., are noted for identifying the roles of three proteins in neurodegenerative diseases: tau in Alzheimer's disease, alpha-synuclein in Parkinson's disease, and TDP-43 in Amyotrophic Lateral Sclerosis (ALS) and frontotemporal degeneration.

Biography
John Quinn Trojanowski was born on December 17, 1946, in Bridgeport, Connecticut, as the second of the seven children of Maurice Trojanowski and Margaret (Quinn) Trojanowski. Trojanowski obtained his M.D./Ph.D. in 1976 from Tufts University in Boston. After a medicine internship at Mt. Auburn Hospital and Harvard Medical School, he began pathology/neuropathology training at Massachusetts General Hospital and Harvard Medical School (1977–1979), and completed training at the University of Pennsylvania School of Medicine in 1980 where he was appointed assistant professor of Pathology and Laboratory Medicine on January 1, 1981, and rose to the rank of tenured full professor in 1990.

Trojanowski held major leadership positions at the University of Pennsylvania including: Director of a National Institute of Aging (NIA) Alzheimer's Disease Center (1991–2022), Principal Investigator of a NIA Program Project Grant on Alzheimer's (AD) and Parkinson's (PD) disease (1990–2005), Director of Medical Pathology (1988–2002), Interim Director (2001–2002) and Director (2002–2022) of the Institute on Aging, Co-Director (1992–2022) of the Center for Neurodegenerative Disease Research, Director, National Institute of Neurological Disorders and Stroke (NINDS) Morris K. Udall Parkinson's Disease Research Center of Excellence (2007–2022), the first William Maul Measey–Truman G. Schnabel, Jr., M.D., Professor of Geriatric Medicine and Gerontology (2003–2022) and Co-director of the Marian S. Ware Alzheimer Drug Discovery Program (2004–2022).

For more than fifteen years, Trojanowski conducted research on AD, PD, motor neuron disease, dementia with Lewy bodies (DLB), frontotemporal lobar degeneration (FTLD) and other aging related nervous system disorders. Most of his >500 publications focus on the pathobiology of neurodegenerative disorders, especially the role of abnormal protein aggregates (misfolded proteins) in these diseases. The major goal of his research was to translate advances into understanding mechanisms of aging related neurodegenerative diseases into meaningful interventions to treat or prevent these disorders.

Trojanowski died in Philadelphia from complications of chronic spinal cord injuries on February 8, 2022, at the age of 75.

Awards

Trojanowski received several awards for his research, including:

 MERIT Award (1986–1994) from the National Institutes of Health (NIH)
 Metropolitan Life Foundation Promising Investigator Award For Alzheimer's  Disease Research (1991)
 Membership in the American Society for Clinical Investigation (1991)
 Established Investigator Award from the National Alliance for Research on  Schizophrenia and Depression (now known as the Brain & Behavior Research Foundation) (1994)
 Metlife Foundation Award for Medical Research in Alzheimer's Disease (1996)
 Potamkin Prize For Research In Pick's, Alzheimer's And Related Diseases (1998)
 First Pioneer Award from the Alzheimer's Association (1998–2003)
 ISI Highly Cited Researcher 2000 (most highly cited neuroscientists for 1981–1999)
 Stanley Cohen Biomedical Research Award of the University of Pennsylvania (2000)
 Membership in the Association of American Physicians (2000)
 2004 Irving Wright Award of Distinction of the American Federation for  Aging Research, and the 2005 Rous-Whipple Award of the American Society for  Investigative Pathology.
 2012 John Scott Award
 Charter Fellow, National Academy of Inventors, Elected 2012
 J. Allyn Taylor International Prize in Medicine, Molecular Basis of Neurological Disorders, the Robarts Institute, London, Ontario, Canada, 2014
 Award for Meritorious Contributions to Neuropathology from the American Association of Neuropathologists, 13 June 2015
 The Mayo Clinic Irving S. Cooper Professorship, “New Understanding of Disease Progression and Therapy in Neurodegenerative Tauopathies”, Mayo Clinic, Rochester, MN, 21 August 2017
 Alzheimer's Association Lifetime Achievement Award in Alzheimer's Disease Research, AAIC Meeting, Chicago, IL, 24 July 2018

Service
 Elected President of the American Association of Neuropathologists (1997–1998), and has been on the editorial board of several neuroscience  and pathology journals.
 Dr. Trojanowski was elected to the Institute of Medicine (2002) and he has  served and continued to serve on local and national aging research committees  including the NIA Neuroscience, Behavior and Sociology of  Aging Study Section (1987–1991)
 National Advisory Council on Aging (NACA) of the NIA (1994–1998)
 NACA Working Group Chair (1996–1998)
 Medical and Scientific Advisory Board of the National Alzheimer's Association (1994–1997) as well as of the Southeastern Pennsylvania Chapter of the  Alzheimer's Association (1992–2022)
 NIA Board of Scientific Counselors (1998–2002)
 Scientific Advisory Boards of the Paul Beeson Physician Faculty Scholars  In Aging Award (1998–2002)
 Alliance for Aging Research (2002–2022) and the Association of  Frontotemporal Dementia (2003–2022)
 Program Committee of the World Alzheimer Congress 2000 (1998–2000)
 Chair of the "Biology of Synuclein and Cortical Lewy Bodies Associated  with Dementia in AD, LBD, and PD" (July, 2001) and “Genetics of Alzheimer’s Disease  (March, 2002) workshops organized by NIA and the National Institute on Neurological  Diseases and Stroke in Bethesda, Maryland, and the Organizing Committee of the 6th  (Seville, Spain, 2003), 7th (Sorrento, Italy, 2005) and 8th (Salzburg, Austria, 2007)  International Conferences On Progress In Alzheimer’s And Parkinson’s Disease  (2001-2009).

Films
To help the public understand what is needed to cure and/or prevent disorders like AD, Trojanowski led an effort to prepare two education films, “Shining a Light on Alzheimer’s Disease . . . through Research” and “Taking the Steps to Healthy Brain Aging”, on Alzheimer's disease and healthy brain aging funded by a grant from the Metropolitan Life Foundation Grant that air on PBS.

References

External links
http://www.med.upenn.edu/aging/
http://www.pennadc.org 
http://www.med.upenn.edu/cndr/
https://web.archive.org/web/20080614133220/http://www.med.upenn.edu/ins/faculty/trojanow.htm
http://www.pennhealth.com/Wagform/MainPage.aspx?config=provider&P=PP&ID=2313
http://www.uphs.upenn.edu/news/News_Releases/july02/PIA.html
http://chronicle.com/blogs/ticker/journal-hits-u-of-pennsylvania-scientists-with-retraction-2-year-ban/94941

1946 births
2022 deaths
Tufts University School of Medicine alumni
University of Pennsylvania alumni
Alzheimer's disease researchers
Harvard Medical School alumni
University of Pennsylvania faculty
Members of the National Academy of Medicine